Mark Leslie Hersey (December 1, 1863 – January 22, 1934) was a major general in the United States Army who commanded the 4th Division during World War I.

Early life and education
Hersey was born in Maine on December 1, 1863, the son of George L. Hersey, and attended the United States Military Academy at West Point from 1883 to 1887. Prior to attending West Point, he received a Bachelor of Arts degree from Bates College. He graduated West Point on June 12, 1887, and was commissioned as a second lieutenant the same day. Among his fellow classmates included several general officers of the future, such as Charles Gerhardt, Charles S. Farnsworth, Nathaniel Fish McClure, Michael Joseph Lenihan, Herman Hall, William Weigel, Ernest Hinds, Ulysses G. McAlexander, James Theodore Dean, Frank Herman Albright, Marcus Daniel Cronin, George Owen Squier, Thomas Grafton Hanson, George Washington Gatchell, Alexander Lucian Dade and Edmund Wittenmyer.

He was promoted to first lieutenant in 1894.

Wars and conflicts
He was a veteran of the Spanish–American War and served as a quartermaster for the 12th Infantry in the Fifth Army Corps in the Santiago Campaign.

Hersey was promoted to captain in 1899 and served as part of the China Relief Expedition during the Boxer Rebellion. In 1902, he received a Master of Arts degree from Bates College. Following the Philippine Insurrection, Hersey served as a colonel with the Philippine Constabulary for ten years.

Hersey was promoted to major in 1911 and to lieutenant colonel in 1916. He served under General John J. Pershing during the punitive expedition in Mexico in 1916.

First World War
Hersey was promoted to colonel in May 1917, shortly after the United States declaring war on Germany. He was promoted to brigadier general in National Army (i.e. a temporary promotion) in August 1917 and assigned as the commander of the 155th Infantry Brigade which was part of the 78th Division. The 78th Division was deployed to France in May and June 1918. He commanded the 155th Infantry Brigade during the later stages of the Meuse-Argonne Offensive and led it in a successful assault on German positions in the Bois des Loges near Tracy-le-Mont.

Hersey was promoted to major general in the National Army in October 1918 and assumed command of the 4th Division in France on 31st of the same month—shortly before the Armistice which ended hostilities on November 11. He commanded the 4th Division during the occupation of Germany before it returned to the United States.

Hersey was awarded the Army Distinguished Service Medal for his leadership of both the 155th Brigade and the 4th Division during the war. The medal's citation reads:

Post-war career
After returning from France, Hersey received honorary Doctor of Laws degrees (LL.D.) from Bates College and the University of Maine.

Hersey reverted to his permanent rank of colonel in August 1919, graduated from the Army War College in 1920 and was promoted to brigadier general in July of the same year. He was promoted to major general shortly before his retirement from the Army, at his own request, in November 1924.

Death and burial
General Hersey died on January 22, 1934, and was buried in Arlington National Cemetery.

Memberships
He was a member of the Pennsylvania Commandery of the Military Order of Foreign Wars. He was also a member of the Military Order of the World War and served as its national commander in 1926.

Family
Hersey married Elizabeth Noyes on September 16, 1887. Together, they had three children: Mark Leslie, Dorothy, and Alice Elizabeth. She died on April 5, 1932 and is buried beside him at Arlington National Cemetery.

His son, Mark L. Hersey, Jr. (1888–1974), was an officer in the United States Navy. He received the Navy Cross for distinguished service while commanding the destroyer USS Sampson (DD-63) during the First World War.   He was the commanding officer of Naval Station Guantanamo Bay from May 1936 to June 1938.  He rose to the rank of commodore during the Second World War. He and his wife are buried near his parents.

Legacy
The , launched April 1944, was named in his honor.

Awards
 Distinguished Service Medal
 Indian Campaign Medal
 Spanish Campaign Medal
 China Relief Expedition Medal
 Philippine Campaign Medal
 Mexican Service Medal
 Victory Medal with four campaign stars
 Army of Occupation of Germany Medal
 Commander, Legion of Honor (France)
 Croix de Guerre with palm (France)

Dates of rank
 2nd Lieutenant – 12 June 1887
 1st Lieutenant – 16 December 1894
 Captain – 2 March 1899
 Major – 3 March 1911
 Lieutenant Colonel – 1 July 1916
 Colonel – 15 May 1917
 Brigadier General, National Army – 5 August 1917 (accepted 28 August 1917)
 Major General, National Army – 1 October 1918 (accepted 14 October 1918)
 Discharged from National Army – 31 August 1919
 Brigadier General – 3 July 1920 (accepted 17 July 1920)
 Major General – 20 September 1924
 Retired – 2 November 1924

References

External links

1863 births
1934 deaths
United States Army Infantry Branch personnel
United States Army generals of World War I
United States Military Academy alumni
Burials at Arlington National Cemetery
Recipients of the Legion of Honour
Recipients of the Distinguished Service Medal (US Army)
United States Army generals
American military personnel of the Spanish–American War
American military personnel of the Philippine–American War
People from Penobscot County, Maine
Military personnel from Maine